The South American Youth Handball Championship is the official competition for Youth Men's and Women's national handball teams of South America. In addition to crowning the South American champions, the tournament also serves as a qualifying tournament for the Pan American Youth Handball Championship.

Men

Summary

Medal table

Participating nations

Women

Summary

Medal table

Participating nations

References
 www.panamhandball.org

Handball competitions in South America